The 2018 Prosperita Open was a professional tennis tournament played on clay courts. It was the 15th edition of the tournament which was part of the 2018 ATP Challenger Tour. It took place in Ostrava, Czech Republic between 30 April and 6 May.

Singles main-draw entrants

Seeds

 1 Rankings are as of 23 April 2018.

Other entrants
The following players received wildcards into the singles main draw:
  Marek Gengel
  Dominik Kellovský
  Patrik Rikl
  Matěj Vocel

The following players received entry from the qualifying draw:
  Elliot Benchetrit
  Mathias Bourgue
  Evan Furness
  Pedro Martínez

Champions

Singles
 
 Arthur De Greef def.  Nino Serdarušić 4–6, 6–4, 6–2.

Doubles

 Attila Balázs /  Gonçalo Oliveira def.  Lukáš Rosol /  Sergiy Stakhovsky 6–0, 7–5.

External links
Official Website

2018 ATP Challenger Tour
2018
2018 in Czech tennis